Kalanga, or TjiKalanga (in Zimbabwe), is a Bantu language spoken by the Kalanga people in Botswana and Zimbabwe. It has an extensive phoneme inventory, which includes palatalised, velarised, aspirated and breathy-voiced consonants, as well as whistled sibilants.

Kalanga is recognised as an official language by the Zimbabwean Constitution of 2013 and is taught in schools in areas where its speakers predominate. The zezuru language is closely related to the Nambya, TshiVenda, and KheLobedu languages of Zimbabwe and South Africa.

Classification and varieties
Linguists place Kalanga (S.16 in Guthrie's classification) and Nambya (in the Hwange region of Zimbabwe) as the western branch of the Shona group (or Shonic, or Shona-Nyai) group of languages, collectively coded as S.10.

Kalanga has a dialectal variation between its Botswana and Zimbabwean varieties and they use slightly different orthographies. Historically, Wentzel mentioned Kalanga proper in the east and Lilima (Tjililima, Humbe) on the west, as well as varieties that are now rare or extinct: Nyai (Rozvi), Lemba (Remba), Lembethu (Rembethu), Twamamba (Xwamamba), Pfumbi, Jaunda (Jawunda, Jahunda), and †Romwe, †Peri, †Talahundra (Talaunda).

Phonology

Consonants 

 Phonemes  occur only as marginal phonemes.
 Sounds  are sounds that are borrowed from Tswana.

Vowels 
Kalanga has a typical five-vowel system:

References

Further reading
 Chebanne, A. M. & Rodewald, M. K & Pahlen, K. W. (1995) Ngatikwaleni iKalanga: A Manual for Writing Kalanga as Spoken in Botswana. Gaborone: Botswana Society.
 Chebanne, Andy & Schmidt, Daniel (2010). "Kalanga: Summary Grammar". Cape Town, South Africa: CASAS Monograph 75.
 Dube, Limukani T. 2021. "Zimbabwe’s Kalanga Orthography: The Strengths and Shortcomings of the 2008 Writing System." Arusha Working Papers in African Linguistics, 3(1): 42-51.
 Letsholo, R. (2013). "Object Markers in Ikalanga". Linguistic Discovery. Dartmouth College.
 Mathangwane, Joyce T. (1999) Ikalanga Phonetics and Phonology: A Synchronic and Diachronic Study. Stanford, CA: CSLI Publications.

External links

Language section of the Kalanga Language and Cultural Development Association website
http://talkingdictionary.swarthmore.edu/kalanga/

 
Shona languages
Languages of Botswana
Languages of Zimbabwe